Ramzi Bahloul (born 18 October 1989) is a Tunisian weightlifter. He represented Tunisia at the 2020 Summer Olympics in Tokyo, Japan. He competed in the men's 81 kg event.

At the 2018 Mediterranean Games held in Tarragona, Catalonia, Spain, he won the silver medal in the 85kg Clean & Jerk event.

In 2020, he finished in 5th place in the men's 81kg event at the Roma 2020 World Cup in Rome, Italy.

References

External links 
 

Living people
1989 births
Place of birth missing (living people)
Tunisian male weightlifters
Competitors at the 2019 African Games
Mediterranean Games medalists in weightlifting
Mediterranean Games gold medalists for Tunisia
Mediterranean Games silver medalists for Tunisia
Competitors at the 2013 Mediterranean Games
Competitors at the 2018 Mediterranean Games
Weightlifters at the 2020 Summer Olympics
Olympic weightlifters of Tunisia
African Weightlifting Championships medalists
21st-century Tunisian people